The Korg KARMA music workstation was released in 2001 as a specialised member of the Korg Triton family. KARMA stands for Kay's Algorithmic Real-time Music Architecture. The unit features up to 62 note polyphony and is 16-part multitimbral. Its sound engine is based on the Korg Triton workstation, although it has fewer features.

Construction
The center section is made of brushed aluminum, and the side cheeks are constructed from plastic.

Sequencer
The unit also features a 16-track sequencer with a maximum storage of 200,000 events and 200 songs

Drum kits
 413 drum sounds
 55 drum kits
 16 User drum kits

Expansions
KORG KARMA's presets can be expanded with KORG EXB cards such as EXB-PCM01 (Pianos/Classic Keyboards), EXB-PCM02 (Studio Essentials), EXB-PCM03 (Future Loop Construction), EXB-PCM04 (Dance Extreme), EXB-PCM05 (Vintage Archives), EXB-PCM06/07 (Orchestral Collection), EXB-PCM08 (Concert Grand Piano), EXB-PCM09 (Trance Attack). 
Moreover, the sound engine can be extended using the valuable 6-voice DSP tone generator derived from the KORG Z1 - EXB-MOSS.

Notable users
 Rick Wakeman
 Phil Collins
 Herbie Hancock
 Peter Gabriel
 Vangelis
 Yes
 Pete Townshend
 Keith Emerson
 Jean-Michel Jarre
 Tuomas Holopainen
 Jordan Rudess

References

External links
 Korg Website
 Karma-Lab Website - Korg KARMA page
 Karma-Lab Wiki - Korg KARMA articles
 Karma-Lab Korg KARMA Video and Audio clips

KARMA
Music workstations
Synthesizers